Atle is a Norwegian given name and may refer to:

Tor Atle Andersen, Norwegian drummer in progressive/power metal band Communic
Atle Antonsen (born 1969), Norwegian comedian and actor
Atle Bakken (born 1970), Norwegian composer, performer and producer
Atle Douglas (born 1968), Norwegian middle distance runner who specialized in the 800 metres
Atle Eide (born 1939), Norwegian businessperson and partner with HitecVision Private Equity
Jon Atle Gaarder (born 1934), Norwegian diplomat
Atle Gulbrandsen (born 1979), Norwegian racing driver and television announcer
Atle Haglund (born 1964), Norwegian ice sledge hockey and ice sledge speed racing athlete
Atle Roar Håland (born 1977), Norwegian football centreback
Atle Hamar (born 1963), Norwegian politician for the Liberal Party
Atle Hansen, Norwegian orienteering competitor and world champion
Atle Jebsen (1935–2009), Norwegian businessperson and ship-owner
Atle Karlsen (keyboardist) (born 1960), Norwegian keyboardist in rock band DumDum Boys
Atle Torbjørn Karlsvik (born 1957), Norwegian naval officer
Atle Kittang (1941–2013), Norwegian literary researcher and literary critic
Atle Kvålsvoll (born 1962), Norwegian professional cyclist
Glen Atle Larsen (born 1982), Norwegian journeyman footballer
Atle Maurud (born 1970), Norwegian football striker
Atle Mjove or Atli the Slender, Norwegian jarl in Heimskringla and Egils saga
Atle Næss (born 1949), Norwegian author
Atle Norstad (born 1961), Norwegian bobsledder
Atle Nymo (born 1977), Norwegian jazz musician on tenor saxophone and bass clarinet
Atle Pettersen (born 1989), Norwegian singer, songwriter, lead singer in band Above Symmetry
Atle Selberg (1917–2007), Norwegian mathematician
Atle Skårdal (born 1966), Norwegian alpine ski racer
Pål Atle Skjervengen (born 1960), Norwegian politician
Atle Ørbeck Sørheim (born 1933), Norwegian veterinarian and civil servant
Atle Teigland (born 1957), Norwegian trade unionist
Atle Thowsen (born 1940), Norwegian historian, and director of the Bergen Maritime Museum
Atle Vårvik (born 1965), Norwegian speed skater
Geir Atle Wøien (born 1975), Norwegian ski jumper

See also
Astle
Astley (disambiguation)
Atlee (disambiguation)
Patle
Vatle

Norwegian masculine given names